Lucas Brothers may refer to:

Lucas Brothers (company), British building business
Kenny and Keith Lucas, comedic twin duo from Lucas Bros. Moving Co.